Mähri Geldiýewa ( Ovezova, born 4 April 1973) is a Turkmen chess player who holds the title of Woman Grandmaster (WGM).

Chess career
In 1993 in Kozhikode Geldiýewa won the bronze medal in the World Girls U-20 Championship. In 1998 in Pahang, Malaysia, she won the bronze medal in the Asian women's Chess Championship. In 2009, she divided the second place in the international chess tournament in Sari and won  Turkmenistan women's chess championship.

In 1996 Geldiýewa awarded the FIDE Woman International Master (WIM) and in 1998 the Woman Grandmaster (WGM) title. She became the first and so far the only Turkmen women chess player who received a Woman Grandmaster title.

Teams 
Geldiýewa has played from 1986 to 1991 for Turkmenistan in Soviet Women's Team Chess Championships. She has played for Turkmenistan in 7 Chess Olympiads (1994-2002, 2006, 2010) and won two individual gold medals at Board 1 in 32nd Chess Olympiad (1996) and 33rd Chess Olympiad (1998). In 2010 she played in the Asian Games.

References

External links

1973 births
Turkmenistan chess players
Chess Olympiad competitors
Chess woman grandmasters
Living people
Chess players at the 2006 Asian Games
Chess players at the 2010 Asian Games
Asian Games competitors for Turkmenistan